The 1942 Irish Greyhound Derby took place during May with the final being held at Cork Greyhound Stadium in Cork on 30 May.

The winner Uacterlainn Riac won £175 but despite the poor prize money the track experienced record crowds. John Crowley a local pub owner (Western Star in Cork) trained Uacterlainn Riac and Jerry Crowley from Ovens owned him. Uacterlainn Riac also won the McAlinden Cup the same year. Cork legend states that the pub was closed for days to huge celebratory crowd afterwards. Uacterlainn Riac (meaning Creamery Brindle) had an attempt at hurdling after the Derby but failed to take to them and plans for a Grand National double were scrapped.

Final result 
At Cork, 30 May (over 525 yards):

Distances 
4, 2 (lengths)

Competition Report
In the final Uacterlainn Riac broke well from the traps to lead all the way.

See also
1942 UK & Ireland Greyhound Racing Year

References

Greyhound Derby
Irish Greyhound Derby